Jennifer Moss may refer to:

 Jennifer Moss (actress) (1945–2006), English actress and singer
 Jennifer Sheridan Moss, American papyrologist
 Jennifer Moss, a Canadian digital media producer whose credits include The Loxleys and the War of 1812